Celebrity Skin is a 1998 album by the group Hole.

Celebrity Skin may also stand for:

"Celebrity Skin" (song), the title song from the Hole album
Celebrity Skin (magazine), a pornographic magazine
Celebrity Skin (band), an early-1990s band from Los Angeles